The 2021 CONCACAF Gold Cup qualification tournament determined the final three teams to qualify for the 2021 CONCACAF Gold Cup.

Prior to the qualifiers, twelve of the sixteen teams of the 2021 CONCACAF Gold Cup had already been decided based on the results of the 2019–20 CONCACAF Nations League:
Eight teams from 2019–20 CONCACAF Nations League A qualified as the top two teams of each group.
Four teams from 2019–20 CONCACAF Nations League B qualified as the winners of each group.

Another twelve teams competed in the qualifiers. The matches were originally scheduled to be played in March and June 2020, but were postponed due to the COVID-19 pandemic. The matches took place from 2 to 6 July 2021, the week before the start of the Gold Cup group stage, at DRV PNK Stadium, Fort Lauderdale, Florida in the United States.

Teams
Twelve teams participated in the 2021 CONCACAF Gold Cup Qualifiers based on the results of the 2019–20 CONCACAF Nations League. These teams were the four group third-placed teams of League A, the four group runners-up of League B, and the four group winners of League C.

Following the suspension of the Trinidad and Tobago Football Association by FIFA on 24 September 2020, CONCACAF announced the following day that Trinidad and Tobago would still participate in the qualifying draw scheduled for 28 September 2020. If the suspension had not been lifted by 18 December 2020, Trinidad and Tobago would have been replaced by the next highest-ranked team in the CONCACAF Nations League which did not qualify for the Gold Cup finals or preliminaries, Antigua and Barbuda (a third-placed team in League B).

Original format
The first round was originally to be played on 26 and 31 March 2020. The four winners of Nations League C would face the four runner-ups of Nations League B, played as two-legged ties. The teams from League B would host the second legs. The four winners would advance to the second round. The second round was originally to be played during the FIFA international window of 1 to 9 June 2020. The four first round winners would face the four third-placed teams of Nations League A, played as two-legged ties. The teams from League A would host the second legs. The four winners would qualify for the 2021 CONCACAF Gold Cup.

Draw
The qualifying draw took place on 11 December 2019, 19:00 EST (UTC−5), in Miami, Florida, United States. Three pots were prepared, with Pot A containing the League A teams, Pot B containing the League B teams and Pot C containing the League C teams. To draw the first round matches, teams from Pot C were first drawn and allocated, in order, to pairings 1 to 4. To complete the fixtures, teams from Pot B were then drawn and allocated, in order, to pairings 1 to 4. To draw the second round matches, the Pot A teams were drawn and allocated to face the winners of first round pairings 1 to 4.

The draw results were as follows:

Postponement
On 13 March 2020, CONCACAF suspended all upcoming competitions scheduled to take place over the next 30 days due to the COVID-19 pandemic, with the new dates of the matches to be confirmed later. On 3 April 2020, CONCACAF announced the suspension of the June qualifiers, with the new dates of the matches to be confirmed at a later time.

New format
On 27 July 2020, CONCACAF announced that the qualifiers would be played by the twelve teams as a centralized preliminary round in the United States, in the week prior to the 2021 CONCACAF Gold Cup group stage. On 2 September 2020, CONCACAF announced that Qatar were invited to the Gold Cup as guests, and that the qualification tournament would determine the last three teams to participate in the group stage of the Gold Cup. The qualification tournament featured two rounds, with the twelve participating teams divided into six one-off ties in the first round. The six winners advanced to the second round, with the winners of the three one-off matches qualifying for the Gold Cup.

Draw
The draw for the first round took place in Miami, Florida on 28 September 2020, 20:00 EDT (UTC−4), along with the draw for the Gold Cup group stage. The top six teams based on the CONCACAF Rankings of August 2020 were pre-seeded into matches 1 to 6 (highest ranked in match 1, second-highest ranked in match 2, etc.), while the remaining six teams were drawn from a single pot. The fixtures for the second round were predetermined.

The following was the composition of the draw pots (August 2020 CONCACAF Rankings show in parentheses):

Bracket
The match schedule was announced on 13 May 2021.

All match times listed are local, EDT (UTC−4).

First round

Summary

{{OneLegResult|||0–3|}}

|}

Matches

Second round

Summary

{{OneLegResult|||1–1 |}}

|}

Matches

Ranking of losing teams
On 9 July 2021, CONCACAF announced that Curaçao, who had qualified for the 2021 CONCACAF Gold Cup via the 2019–20 CONCACAF Nations League (League A Group D second place), would not participate in the tournament due to a high number of COVID-19 cases within the team. As a result, CONCACAF decided to replace them with the next highest-ranked team from qualification (based on wins, draws and goal difference), Guatemala.

Qualified teams

1 Bold indicates champions for that year. Italic indicates hosts for that year.

Statistics

Goalscorers

Best XI
The Best XI squad of the first and second preliminary rounds was selected by CONCACAF following the conclusion of matches.

Notes

References

External links

Schedule & Results 

Qualifiers
2021 Gold Cup
Gold Cup qual
July 2021 sports events in the United States
Association football events postponed due to the COVID-19 pandemic